Torridge may refer to:

 Torridge District, a local government district in the county of Devon, England
 River Torridge, is a river in Devon in England
 Torridge Lass, a company
 Torridge Hospital was a health facility in Meddon Street, Bideford, Devon, England